"Stormy Monday Blues" is a jazz song first recorded in 1942 by Earl Hines and His Orchestra with Billy Eckstine on vocals.  The song was a hit, reaching number one in Billboard magazine's "Harlem Hit Parade", and was Hines' only appearance in the charts.

Background
"Stormy Monday Blues" is performed in the style of a slow blues that "starts with Hines' piano and a walking bass for the introduction".  Billy Eckstine then enters with the vocal:

The lyrics "stormy" or "Monday" do not appear in the song.  A trumpet solo by Maurice "Shorty" McConnell with big band backing is featured in the second half of the song.  Eckstine later recorded "Stormy Monday Blues" in 1959 with Count Basie for their Basie/Eckstine Incorporated album.

The song has sometimes been confused with T-Bone Walker's 1947 song "Call It Stormy Monday (But Tuesday Is Just as Bad)", which is frequently shortened to "Stormy Monday" or "Stormy Monday Blues".

See also
List of number-one R&B singles of 1942 (U.S.)

References

1942 songs
Jazz songs